Ronald J. Slay (November 15, 1890 – September 18, 1948) was an American football, basketball, and baseball coach. A teacher of science and modern language, he was appointed by the faculty of Mississippi Normal College—now known as the University of Southern Mississippi—in Hattiesburg, Mississippi as school's first head football coach in 1912.  He served in that capacity for one season, compiling a record of 2–1. Slay was also the head basketball coach at Mississippi Normal in 1912–13 and from 1918 to 1920, tallying a mark of 9–7, and the school's head baseball coach from 1914 to 1916 and in 1919, tallying a mark  4–5.

Head coaching record

Football

References

External links
 

1890 births
1948 deaths
Basketball coaches from Mississippi
Southern Miss Golden Eagles and Lady Eagles athletic directors
Southern Miss Golden Eagles baseball coaches
Southern Miss Golden Eagles basketball coaches
Southern Miss Golden Eagles football coaches
University of Southern Mississippi faculty
People from Lamar County, Mississippi